Daniel G. McMullen Jr. (December 18, 1934 – December 5, 2006) was an American politician. He served as a Democratic member of the Florida House of Representatives.

Life and career 
McMullen was born in Clearwater, Florida. He attended Clearwater High School, St. Petersburg College and Clemson University.

In 1965, McMullen was elected to the Florida House of Representatives, serving until 1966.

McMullen died in December 2006 of cancer in Port Richey, Florida, at the age of 71.

References 

1934 births
2006 deaths
People from Clearwater, Florida
Democratic Party members of the Florida House of Representatives
20th-century American politicians
St. Petersburg College alumni
Clemson University alumni
Deaths from cancer in Florida